Walter P. Moore and Associates, Inc. (d/b/a Walter P Moore) is an international company providing structural engineering, diagnostics, civil engineering, traffic engineering, parking consulting, transportation engineering, intelligent transportation systems (ITS) engineering, and water resources engineering services. Headquartered in Houston, Texas, the firm employs more than 600 professionals and operates 20 U.S. and five international offices.

History 
In 1931, just as America's Great Depression entered its worst years, Walter P. Moore, Sr. started his own company by selling a Stutz Bearcat he had received in lieu of employment wages. The firm's earliest projects consisted of designing foundations for residential estates at $5 each, but they would later go on to engineer the world's first domed stadium (the Astrodome) and become pioneers in moveable structures, particularly retractable roof sports stadia. They also designed the first (and only, as of 2015) retractable playing field (also called a moving pitch) in North America.

While the company originated as a family-owned structural engineering firm, they have since expanded their services to include comprehensive infrastructure engineering (civil, traffic, transportation, ITS, and water resources engineering) and transitioned leadership into an employee-owned company governed by a board of directors and Chief Executive Officer (Dilip Choudhuri, 2015–present; Raymond Messer 1992–2014).

Notable projects 
 Empower Field at Mile High (NFL Denver Broncos), Denver,  Co
 AT&T Stadium (NFL Cowboys Stadium), Arlington, TX
 SoFi Stadium (NFL Los Angeles Rams and Chargers Stadium), Inglewood, CA
 Chase Center (NBA Golden State Warriors), San Francisco, CA
 McCarran International Airport Terminal 3, Las Vegas, NV
 Bass Hall, concert auditorium, Fort Worth, TX
 NRG Stadium (NFL Houston Texans), Houston, TX
 State Farm Stadium (NFL Arizona Cardinals), Glendale, AZ
 San Francisco Airport Air Traffic Control Tower, San Francisco, CA
 Daytona Rising (Daytona International Speedway), Daytona, FL
 Lucas Oil Stadium (NFL Indianapolis Colts), Indianapolis, IN
 Salvador Dalí Museum, St. Petersburg, FL
 Guangzhou International Sports Arena, Guangzhou, China
 Astrodome (NFL Houston Oilers, MLB Houston Astros), Houston, TX
 US Census Bureau, Suitland, MD
 Kyle Field (Texas A&M Football), College Station, TX
 Hartsfield Jackson Atlanta International Airport Consolidated Rental Agency Complex, Atlanta, GA
 Marlins Park (MLB Miami Marlins), Miami, FL
 King Abdullah University of Science and Technology, Thuwal, Saudi Arabia
 Truist Park (MLB Atlanta Braves), Atlanta, GA
 Bagby Street Reconstruction (Green Road), Houston, TX
 Kansas City Municipal Auditorium, Kansas City, MO
 Duke Medicine Pavilion Patient Tower, Durham, NC
 Target Field (MLB Minnesota Twins), Minneapolis, MN
 Federal Reserve Bank of Dallas Houston Branch, Houston,TX
 Amway Center (NBA Orlando Magic), Orlando, FL
 T-Mobile Center, Kansas City, MO
 King Abdullah Petroleum Studies and Research Center, Thuwal, Saudi Arabia
 Bank of America Corporate Center, Charlotte, NC
 BBVA Stadium (MLS Houston Dynamo), Houston, TX
 Bethel Church Park, Houston, TX
 Midtown, Houston reconstruction, Houston, TX
 McCormick Place, Chicago, IL
 One Riverway Garage collapse investigation, Houston, TX
 San Antonio Military Medical Center, San Antonio, TX
 Ocean Tower failure analysis, South Padre Island, TX
 Grand Parkway Traffic & ITS, Houston, TX
 Mickey Leland Federal Building Renovation, Houston, TX
 Spring Woods Village master plan & community development, Houston, TX
 METRORail (Astrodome to Downtown) traffic engineering and planning, Houston, TX
 Sardar Patel Stadium, Ahmedabad, Gujarat, India

References

External links
Official Walter P Moore website

Construction and civil engineering companies established in 1931
Companies based in Houston
Engineering companies of the United States
1931 establishments in Texas